Ottawa (County of) was a federal electoral district in Quebec in the House of Commons of Canada from 1867 to 1892. It was based in the Outaouais region of Quebec, across the Ottawa River from the city of Ottawa, Ontario.

The electoral district was created by the British North America Act, 1867, based on the former electoral district of Ottawa in the Legislative Assembly of the Province of Canada.  The district was redistributed into the new electoral districts of Wright and Labelle in 1892.

Members of the Legislative Assembly of Lower Canada

This riding elected the following members of the Legislative Assembly of Lower Canada:

Philemon Wright (1830–1834)
Theodore Davis (1832–1834) (second member added)
James Blackburn & Baxter Bowman (1834–1838)

Members of the Legislative Assembly of the Province of Canada

This riding elected the following members of the Legislative Assembly of the Province of Canada:

Charles Dewey Day, (1841–1842)
Denis-Benjamin Papineau, (1842–1848)
John Egan, {1848-1854)
Alanson Cooke, (1854–1858)
Denis-Émery Papineau, (1858–1861)
William McDonell Dawson, (1861-1863}
Alonzo Wright, (1863–1867)

Members of Parliament

This riding elected the following Members of Parliament:

Election results

See also 

 List of Canadian federal electoral districts
 Past Canadian electoral districts

External links 
 Riding history from the Library of Parliament

Former federal electoral districts of Quebec